Matthew Lowe is the name of:

Matthew Lowe (footballer, born 1990)
Matt Lowe (footballer, born 1996)
Matthew Lowe (swimmer)